Yanick Lahens (born 22 December 1953, Port-au-Prince) is a Haitian Francophone writer, novelist, teacher, and lecturer. She became a Prix Femina laureate in 2014.

Biography
Born in Port-au-Prince, Lahens attended high school and university in France before returning to Haiti where she taught until 1995 at the University of Haiti. During the following two years, she served in the office of the Minister of Culture. In 1998, she led the project "Road to slavery". With Jan J. Dominique, Lahens hosts a radio talk show, "Entre Nous". She is affiliated with the Association of Haitian writers, and is a contributor to Chemins critiques, Cultura and Boutures. Her first novel, Dans la maison du père, was published in 2000. In 2014, she received the Prix Femina for Bain de lune. Lahens plays an active role in the development of her country's culture.

Selected works 
 1990, L'Exil : entre l'ancrage et la fuite, l'écrivain haïtien
 1994, Tante Résia et les Dieux 
 2000, Dans la maison du père
 2003, La Petite Corruption
 2006, La folie était venue avec la pluie
 2008, La Couleur de l'aube, Prix RFO du livre (2009)
 2010, Failles 
 2013, Guillaume et Nathalie
 2014, Bain de lune

Awards
2002: LiBeraturpreis, Prix du Salon du livre de Leipzig
2008: Prix Millepages
2009: Prix RFO du livre
2014: Prix littéraire des Caraïbes de l'ADELF
2014: Prix Carbet des lycéens
2014: Prix Femina

References

External links
Yanick Lahens at 2016 Berlin International Literature Festival (in German)

1953 births
Living people
Haitian women novelists
People from Port-au-Prince
Academic staff of the State University of Haiti
Haitian writers in French
21st-century Haitian novelists
21st-century Haitian women writers
Prix Femina winners